Inhibin, beta A, also known as INHBA, is a protein which in humans is encoded by the INHBA gene. INHBA is a subunit of both activin and inhibin, two closely related glycoproteins with opposing biological effects.

Function 

The inhibin beta A subunit joins the alpha subunit to form a pituitary FSH secretion inhibitor. Inhibin has been shown to regulate gonadal stromal cell proliferation negatively and to have tumor-suppressor activity. In addition, serum levels of inhibin have been shown to reflect the size of granulosa-cell tumors and can therefore be used as a marker for primary as well as recurrent disease. Because expression in gonadal and various extragonadal tissues may vary several fold in a tissue-specific fashion, it is proposed that inhibin may be both a growth/differentiation factor and a hormone. Furthermore, the beta A subunit forms a homodimer, activin A, and also joins with a beta B subunit to form a heterodimer, activin AB, both of which stimulate FSH secretion. Finally, it has been shown that the beta A subunit mRNA is identical to the erythroid differentiation factor subunit mRNA and that only one gene for this mRNA exists in the human genome.

Interactions
INHBA has been shown to interact with ACVR2A.

References

Further reading

sr:INHBB